A by-election was held for the Australian House of Representatives seat of West Sydney on 3 September 1921. This was triggered by the death of Labor MP T. J. Ryan.

The by-election was won by Labor candidate William Lambert.

Results

References

1921 elections in Australia
New South Wales federal by-elections
1920s in Sydney